Eucobresia is a genus of air-breathing land snails or semi-slugs, terrestrial pulmonate gastropod mollusks in the family Vitrinidae, the glass snails.

Species
Species within the genus Eucobresia include:
 Eucobresia diaphana (Draparnaud, 1805)
 Eucobresia glacialis
 Eucobresia nivalis (Dumont & Mortillet, 1854)
Eucobresia pegorarii

References

Vitrinidae